Latvia debuted in the Eurovision Song Contest 2000 with the song "My Star" by band Brainstorm. The song was written by band's lead singer Renārs Kaupers. The Latvian broadcaster Latvijas Televīzija (LTV) organised the national final Eirodziesma 2000 in order to select the Latvian entry for the 2000 contest in Stockholm, Sweden. Ten songs were selected to compete in the national final on 26 February 2000 where a public televote and a fourteen-member jury panel selected "My Star" performed by Brainstorm as the winner.

Latvia competed in the Eurovision Song Contest which took place on 13 May 2000. Performing during the show in position 21, Latvia placed third out of the 24 participating countries, scoring 136 points.

Background 

On 15 December 1999, the Latvian national broadcaster, Latvijas Televīzija (LTV), confirmed their intentions to debut at the Eurovision Song Contest 2000 for the first time. That decision was motivated by the participation of Estonia and Lithuania as well as having received sufficient funds for participation through sponsorships. The nation had previously planned to debut at the Eurovision Song Contest in 1993 and 1999; the latter year the broadcaster withdrew their application due to the financial problems. LTV, which broadcast the 1998 and 1999 contests in Latvia, organised the selection process for the nation's entry in addition to broadcasting further events within the nation. Along with the participation confirmation, the broadcaster confirmed that the Latvian entry for the 2000 contest would be selected through a national selection show Eirodziesma.

Before Eurovision

Eirodziesma 2000 
To select its entry for the Eurovision Song Contest 2000, LTV hosted a national final, entitled Eirodziesma 2000, on 26 February 2000 at the LTV studios in Zaķusala, Riga. National final was hosted by Dita Torstere and broadcast on LTV1. Prior to the event, LTV opened a submissions window for interested artists and composers to submit their songs for consideration, by the close of which, 67 songs were submitted and 14 performers applied for the contest; twelve competing entries were then selected for the competition. Two songs were later disqualified prior to the competition. Ten remaining entries competed with the winning song determined by the combination of votes from a jury panel and public televoting. At the close of voting, "My Star" performed by Brainstorm received the most votes and was selected as the Latvian entry.

At Eurovision 

The Eurovision Song Contest 2000 took place at the Globe Arena in Stockholm, Sweden, on 13 May 2000. According to the Eurovision rules, the 24-country participant list for the contest was composed of: the previous year's winning country and host nation Sweden, "Big Four" countries, the thirteen countries, which had obtained the highest average points total over the preceding five contests, and any eligible countries which did not compete in the 1999 contest. Latvia was one of the eligible countries which did not compete in the 1999 contest, and thus were permitted to participate. The running order for the contest was decided by a draw held on 21 November 1999; Latvia was assigned to perform 21st at the 2000 contest, following Finland and preceding Turkey. Eurovision Song Contest 2000 was televised in Latvia on LTV with the commentary by Kārlis Streips. The contest was watched by a total of 380 thousand viewers in Latvia with the market share of 42%.

The Latvian performance featured Brainstorm members performing with instruments on stage in a band set-up. The stage colours were predominantly blue and green and the LED screens displayed blue and green leaves. After the voting concluded, Latvia scored 136 points, including 4 sets of highest score of 12 points, from Belgium, Estonia, Finland and Norway; and placed 3rd. This result was the Latvia's best placing in its competitive history until nation's win in 2002 and was the nation's first finish in top 3.

Voting
The same voting system in use since 1975 was again implemented for 2000 contest, with each country providing 1–8, 10 and 12 points to the ten highest-ranking songs as determined by a selected jury or the viewing public through televoting, with countries not allowed to vote for themselves. Latvia had intended to use televoting, however, due to a technical failure of the telephone system caused by an unexpectedly large number of votes being cast, the votes of jury panel, consisting of Vineta Vilistere, Olga Piraga, Liga Robezniece, Ilma Rugaja, Karlis Lacis, Valdis Melderis, Aivars Hermanis and Arvids Murnieks, were instead used to determine nation's points. The Latvian spokesperson, who announced the Latvian votes during the final, was Lauris Reiniks. Below is a breakdown of points awarded to Latvia and awarded by Latvia in the grand final of the contest. The nation awarded its 12 points to Denmark in the contest.

Controversy
After the contest, the Latvian jury votes in the final faced scrutiny in Russian media. Latvian jury didn't award Russia any points; this led to some suggesting that the Latvian jury votes might have been politically influenced. Prime Minister of Latvia Andris Berzins later denied accusations of politicization of the Latvian jury, saying that "this case cannot be politicized [sic]".

References

Bibliography 
 

2000
Countries in the Eurovision Song Contest 2000
Eurovision